Yinostius is an extinct genus of heterosteid placoderm of the Middle Devonian known from remains discovered in China.

Description
This genus is known from Emsian-aged specimens from the Wuding region of Yunnan, China. In overall anatomy, it is extremely similar to the European genera, though it differs from them in its slightly smaller size, the shape of its nuchal plate, and in various body proportions.

Phylogeny
Yinostius is a member of the family Heterosteidae, which belongs to the superfamily Dunkleosteoidea. It is a relative of the giant Dunkleosteus, as shown in the cladogram below:

References

Arthrodires
Placoderm families
Early Devonian first appearances
Early Devonian extinctions